xScope is a utility by The Iconfactory & ARTIS Software that can measure any element displayed on screen. The idea behind the program is that designers can check the size of their work against real-world computer display measurements and be able to measure their work as well.

Features
 Dimensions show the pixel size (for both X and Y dimensions) of any object within a color range under the mouse.
 Rulers measuring pixel size in both X and Y dimensions are shown over the screen and can be rotated 360 degrees.
 Screens overlays common screen resolutions along with the area of webpages visible to common browsers within those resolutions.
 Loupe is an adjustable magnifying glass that shows the specific pixel color under the mouse.
 Guides are vertical and horizontal guide lines displayed over the screen to be used as guides.
 Frames of to custom sizes can shown on-screen.
 Crosshair shows the pixel coordinates of the cursor on the monitor.

References

MacOS-only software
The Iconfactory